Century Golden Resources Group is a Chinese privately held real estate development company.

It is headed by the Chinese billionaire Huang Rulun and has over 20,000 employees. The company has invested in 20 five-star hotels and 10 shopping malls, with revenues in 2013 of nearly $5 billion.

References

Real estate companies of China
Chinese companies established in 1991